Edward Carter may refer to:

Edward A. Carter Jr. (1916–1963), U.S. Army Medal of Honor recipient for actions during World War II
Edward Clark Carter (1878–1954), Institute of Pacific Relations
Edward Carter (politician) (1822–1883), Canadian politician
Edward Bonham Carter (born 1960), CEO of a British fund management group
Edward W. Carter (1911–1996), American businessman, philanthropist and art collector
Ed Carter, character in the Charlie Higson novel The Dead

See also
Edward Carter Preston (1885–1965), English artist